Tsing Shan Tsuen is a village in Tuen Mun District, Hong Kong.

Administration
Tsing Shan Tsuen is one of the 36 villages represented within the Tuen Mun Rural Committee. For electoral purposes, Tsing Shan Tsuen is part of the Lung Mun constituency.

Conservation
The location of a cinnamomum cassia tree within Ho Shek Nunnery was designated as a Site of Special Scientific Interest in 1976. It was de-designated in 2008.

See also
 Tsing Shan Monastery
 Tsing Shan Tsuen stop

References

External links

 Delineation of area of existing village Tsing Shan Tsuen (Tuen Mun) for election of resident representative (2019 to 2022)

Villages in Tuen Mun District, Hong Kong